= Style at Home (UK magazine) =

British interior design magazine

- Editor: Lizzie Hudson
- Categories: Interior design
- Frequency: Monthly
- Circulation: 97,890 (ABC Jul - Dec 2013); Print and digital editions.
- Publisher: IPC Media
- First issue: May 2011
- Country: United Kingdom
- Language: English
- Website: Style at Home

Style at Home is a monthly interior design magazine published by TI Media. It is edited by Lizzie Hudson.

== Early history ==
The magazine was launched in May 2011 following a successful three-issue pilot.
